Linjiang (listed as Linkiang on old maps) is a county-level city in southern Jilin province, People's Republic of China, located to the east of Tonghua, and not far from the border with North Korea. It is a county-level city under the administration of Baishan.

Culture 
During 1953–76, there was a total of twenty one Chinese films being shot on location in Linjiang, including Visitors on the Icy Mountain.

Geography and Climate

Linjiang has a monsoon-influenced humid continental climate (Köppen Dwa), with long, very cold winters, and very warm, humid summers. Though the annual total is generous, precipitation is quite low during the winter and rainfall is concentrated in the months of June through August. Sunshine is generous but falling far short of the central and western parts of Jilin; with monthly percent possible sunshine ranging from 42% in July to 60% in February, there are 2,232 hours of bright sunshine annually.

Administrative divisions
There are six subdistricts, six towns and one townships under the city's administration:

Subdistricts
Jianguo Subdistrict, Xinshi Subdistrict, Xinglong Subdistrict, Dahu Subdistrict, Sengong Subdistrict, Dalizi Subdistrict

Towns:
Huashu, Liudaogou, Weishahe, Huashan, Naozhi, Sidaogou

The only township is Mayihe Township

See also
 Linjiang Yalu River Bridge

References

External links

Cities in Jilin
Baishan
County-level divisions of Jilin
China–North Korea border crossings
Capitals of former nations